Un Canto por México, Vol. 2 (English: "A Song for México, Volume 2"), is the ninth studio album by Mexican recording artist Natalia Lafourcade, based on a concert made on November 4, 2019 called Un canto por México para la reconstrucción del Centro de Documentación del Son Jarocho, it is the second part of the project following the 2020 album  Un Canto por México, Vol. 1. It was released on May 28, 2021.

At the 22nd Annual Latin Grammy Awards, the album received nominations for Album of the Year and Best Engineered Album, while at the 64th Annual Grammy Awards it was nominated for Best Regional Mexican Music Album (including Tejano).

Background
Like the previous volume, Un Canto para México, Vol. 2 is part of a project destined to the reconstruction of the Centro de Documentación del Son Jarocho at Jáltipan de Morelos, a cultural building that was damaged after the 2017 Puebla earthquake on 19 September 2017. The album follows the format of her previous effort, Musas, which was also divided in two volumes and featured a remarkable set of collaborations with Latin artists.

The album contains songs by Lafourcade, like "Para que sufrir" from Hasta la Raíz, traditional songs including a cover of "La Llorona", a song that also appeared in Musas, Vol. 2, this time alongside Mexican singers Ely Guerra and Silvana Estrada, and songs from other Latin American artists like "Cien Años" from Mexican singer Pedro Infante, "La trenza-Amor completo" from Chilean singer Mon Laferte and "Recuérdame", a song written by Kristen Anderson-Lopez and Robert Lopez for the 2017 animated movie Coco.

Reception
Un Canto por México, Vol. 2 was ranked at number five in the list for "The 35 Best Spanish-Language and Bilingual Albums of 2021" by the American magazine Rolling Stone.

Singles
The first single was a cover of Pedro Infante's "Cien Años", released on April 5, 2021 featuring Infante. The second single was a version of "Tú si sabes quererme" with Mexican singer Mare Advertencia Lirika and Panamanian Rubén Blades released on May 13, 2021. The third single, "Nada es verdad" with Los Cojolitos was released on May 27, 2021.

Track listing
All tracks are produced by Kiko Campos.

References

External links
Official website

2021 albums
Natalia Lafourcade albums
Sony Music Mexico albums